Fabricio David Vay (born March 26, 1986) is an Argentine-Italian professional basketball player. Vay plays for the Austrian team Arkadia Traiskirchen Lions since 2005, but has played for multiple different teams as well during his period with the Lions.

Personal
Vay owns the Italian nationality under the Bosman ruling.

References

1986 births
Living people
AB Castelló players
Argentine expatriate basketball people in Spain
Argentine expatriate basketball people in the United States
Argentine men's basketball players
CB Vic players
Gimnasia y Esgrima de Comodoro Rivadavia basketball players
Iowa Energy players
Italian expatriate basketball people in Spain
Italian men's basketball players
PVSK Panthers players
Small forwards
Traiskirchen Lions players
Valencia Basket players